Little Miss Broadway is a 1938 American musical drama film directed by Irving Cummings. The screenplay was written by Harry Tugend and Jack Yellen. The film stars Shirley Temple in a story about a theatrical boarding house and its occupants, and was originally titled Little Lady of Broadway. In 2009, the film was available on DVD and videocassette.

Plot
Betsy Brown is released from an orphanage into the care of Pop Shea, her parents' friend who runs a boarding house for theatrical performers.  Sarah Wendling, the curmudgeon owner and next-door neighbor of the building, detests "show people" and their noise, and demands Pop pay the $2,500 back rent he owes or move out immediately. Her nephew Roger is in love with Pop's daughter Barbara and files suit against Sarah in order to gain control of the building and his inheritance, with which he plans to stage a show starring the hotel's residents. Sarah questions the soundness of Roger's investment in the show, and Betsy convinces the judge to see the production before he decides the case. With the assistance of her friends, the little girl presents a lavish musical revue in the courtroom that so impresses one of the observers, he offers the troupe $2,500 a week to star in his International Follies. Having had a change of heart, Sarah insists the show is worth $5,000 and convinces the impresario to double his offer. Roger and Barbara then announce their intent to wed and adopt Betsy.

Cast

 Shirley Temple as Betsy Brown, an orphan
 Edward Ellis as Pop Shea, Betsy's parents' friend
 Edna May Oliver as Sarah Wendling
 Donald Meek as Willoughby Wendling, Sarah’s brother
 George Murphy as Roger, Sarah's nephew, Betsy's adoptive father
 Phyllis Brooks as Barbara, Pop's daughter, Betsy's adoptive mother
 Jimmy Durante as Jimmy Clayton, a bandleader
 Jane Darwell as Miss Hutchins
 Patricia Wilder as Flossie
 Robert Gleckler as Detective
 George Barbier as Fiske
 Barbra Bell Cross as Carol, an orphan
 El Brendel as Ole, an animal trainer
 George Brasno as George
 Olive Brasno as Olive

Production

Murphy, who was not satisfied with the dance routine in "We Should Be Together," insisted that movie's closing dance number be reworked. Despite Temple's mother's concerns, Temple was on board with it. The dance number proved so popular with the cast and crew that Murphy and Temple gave an encore performance after the cameras stopped rolling.

Music
Six songs were written by Harold Spina (music) and Walter Bullock (lyrics). All were performed by Temple.
 "Little Miss Broadway"
 "Be Optimistic"
 "How Can I Thank You?"
 "We Should Be Together"
 "If All the World Were Paper"
 "Swing Me an Old Fashioned Song"

Other songs appearing in the movie include:
 "When You Were Sweet Sixteen"

Release

Critical reception
The New York Times wrote, "The devastating Mistress Temple is slightly less devastating than usual [...] it can't be old age, but it does look like weariness [...] although she performs with her customary gaiety and dimpled charm, there is no mistaking the effort every dimple cost her."

TV Guide called it "a delightful Shirley Temple vehicle in which she again does what she does best – portray a singing, dancing, pouting orphan girl."

Home media
The film has been released on videocassette and DVD.  Some editions have special features and theatrical trailers.

See also
 Shirley Temple filmography

References

1938 films
American black-and-white films
Films about orphans
Films directed by Irving Cummings
20th Century Fox films
Films produced by Darryl F. Zanuck
American musical drama films
1930s musical drama films
1938 drama films
1930s American films